The Sculpture Park Erich Engelbrecht is located at the Château des Fougis, 03220 Thionne, department of Allier, France, and displays steel sculptures of the German artist Erich Engelbrecht.

In 2001, Erich Engelbrecht bought the property with the intent of installing his Sculpture Park throughout the gardens and former farming and hunting fields of Château des Fougis.

On loan from a private collection, the artist and his wife also mounted a second exhibition in the main wing of the castle, presenting some previous works like large format tapestries, oil paintings, small steel figures and graphics.

The open air exhibition at the Sculpture Park is open to public. The indoor exhibition can only be visited with a private appointment.

Les Fougis (the site)

“In the 15th century, according to tradition, Les Fougis were the hunting grounds of the Bourbons. The  retained the ownership of  until 1727, the date on which the territory was bequeathed to a nephew, . Their descendants retained it until the French Revolution.

Rebuilt at the end of the 16th century (a doorway in classic style is dated 1593) the Fougis have walls pierced with more decorative openings.

The château is composed of a main rectangular building, flanked by two square towers on its southwest and northeast corners, and a round tower to the southeast. A second perpendicular wing to the north is also flanked by another square tower on its east corner. The walls are made of red and dark brown brickwork, paired to form lozenge patterns. The openings are framed with white limestone. The north façade and some windows to the other sides were modified throughout the end of the 19th century.”

At the turn of the 19th to the 20th centuries, the house was completely renovated and remodeled. The main courtyard received arcades on both wings, one of them with a glazed loggia. The north wing became an extra floor for the extended family and services. The interiors present a language typical for the period.

After acquiring the property, Erich Engelbrecht undertook a multitude of renovation and building works on the fields and buildings to adapt Les Fougis for these exhibitions.

Some of his family members settled in Fougis, where they presently live and work.

Erich Engelbrecht (the artist)
Erich Engelbrecht (Bielefeld, 27 October 1928-Vichy, France, 21 July 2011) was a German artist who left a number of works in the fields of painting, graphics, tapestry, sculpture, architecture, and poetry.

Construction

The first sculptures arrived in 2002 and until his death in 2011, he managed to create an open exhibition of 29 large, monumental and (mostly) colored sculptures. The last sculpture - the smallest - arrived just after his death.

All sculptures were produced in Germany and transported by road to Fougis, where they were finally assembled.

Two sculptures positioned at the entrance of the park were created in 1984 and came to the present place after originally guarding the entrance of his property in Germany for nearly a decade and being exhibited in Hamburg-Altona (Altonaer Balkon) for nearly another decade. Belonging to a private collection, these two sculptures are displayed on loan to the sculpture park.

Some sculptures are distributed around the Château des Fougis, others follow a path designed by the artist.

The indoor exhibition, a selection of large-format tapestries, oil paintings, small steel figures and graphics of Erich Engelbrecht, all on loan from a private collection, was imagined and installed between 2004 and 2010 by the artist himself and his wife Mrs. Waltraud Engelbrecht. It is displayed throughout the galleries and the two main reception rooms of the Château des Fougis, which were specially renovated to receive these works.

List of Sculptures

List of Sculptures in the park with catalogue reference, original work and its date, date of arrival each sculpture in Fougis, dimensions (height, width, thickness & weight) and finishing

 
Units for dimensions: Height, Width (sculpture) and Thickness (steel platte) are in meters, the Weight (including plinth) in metric tonnes.
 All sculptures were cut from massive steel plates.
The 7 digits reference in the present inventory for the catalogue : the first group with 3 digits report to the numbering within a type of works, the second group with 4 digits to the global work by the artist.
 Column "O" (for "Originalwerk", Original Work):  D - Drawing (25); P - Painting (3); S - Steel Sculpture (based on a previous wooden sculpture) (1); W - Wooden Sculpture (1).
 Column "Date" indicates the year of the Original Work as drawing, painting or sculpture.
 Column "FR" indicates the year of arrival in Fougis. Sculptures #28 & #29 were produced in 1984 and stood previously in Melle and Hamburg, before arriving 2006 in Fougis.

Further reading

Two books on Erich Engelbrecht and the Sculpture Park have been published at Edition Axel Menges.

  - A book/catalogue about the Sculpture Park on the series OPUS (in English and French), with contributions from Dr. Gottfried Knapp and Arch. João J. de Abreu Vares.
  - A Monograph Erich Engelbrecht (in German and English), with written contributions from Waltraud Engelbrecht, Renate Vogt, Dr, Gottfried Knapp and an interview with Hans-Jürgen Vogt, a longtime friend and patron Erich Engelbrecht. It will also include a first catalogue/listing on the works of the artist.

References

External links
Erich Engelbrecht (artist website)
Château des Fougis (artist website)
Pictures Sculpture park (artist website)
Auvergne-Tourism.info: Monumental Sculptures Erich Engelbrecht 
Lamontagne.fr Erich Engelbrecht... sculptures 
LaMontagne 17.08.2014 
Mein Frankreich 
Benedikt Pictures - "The woman and the dragon" (a short documentary) 
Mon Bourbonnais - Château des Fougis 
Axel Menges - catalogue Fall 2018 

Tourist attractions in Allier
Artist-run centres
Engelbrecht
Sculpture exhibitions
Contemporary art exhibitions
German contemporary art
German contemporary artists
Installation art works
Sculpture gardens, trails and parks in France
Outdoor sculptures in France
German sculpture
Sculptures in France
Sculpture galleries in France
Steel sculptures